The Caudron C.530 Rafale was a French two seat competition aircraft. Only seven were built but they had great success in several contests during 1934.

Design and development

The C.530 was a low wing cantilever monoplane, wood framed and fabric covered, with a good deal in common with its predecessor and namesake, the Caudron C.430 Rafale, though with a lower wing loading. Its wing was tapered, round tipped and carried split flaps.  Its fuselage was flat sided, with a deep, rounded decking running the full length. It had an air cooled  Renault Bengali Junior inverted four cylinder inline engine in the nose, driving a two blade, variable pitch propeller. This engine was a version of the Renault 4P with its compression increased to 6:1 and running at the higher speed of 2,450 rpm. The Rafale's two seats were in tandem, one over the wing and the other just behind the trailing edge, under a long (about a third of the fuselage length), narrow multi-framed canopy with a blunt, vertical windscreen and sliding access. Behind the canopy a long fairing continued its profile to the straight tapered, round tipped vertical tail.  The horizontal tail was mounted largely ahead of the fin on the top of the fuselage.

The Rafale had a fixed wide track, tailskid undercarriage. Its wheels were on vertical, slender aerofoil section legs from the wings and were largely enclosed within magnesium alloy fairings.

The date of the first flight is not certain but it was certainly flying by 7 June 1934, possibly for the first time. Another six examples built were registered soon after.

Operational history

The C.530 Rafale was intended as a competition aircraft and in 1934 it was very successful. On 8 July Rafales took the first three places in the Angers 12 hour event and later that month filled the top six Esders Cup positions.

In 1935 two of the C.530s were converted into C.660 Rafales, powered by Renault  six cylinder inverted inline engines.  One of these won that year's Angers 12 hour event.

Specifications

References

C.530
1930s French sport aircraft
Single-engined tractor aircraft
Low-wing aircraft
Aircraft first flown in 1934